FC Shakhtyor Petrikov is a football team from Petrikov, Gomel Oblast, Belarus, currently playing in the Belarusian First League. The club is a farm club of FC Shakhtyor Soligorsk.

History
The club was founded in 2020 and joined the Belarusian Second League the same year. They finished second in their debut season, and made their Belarusian First League debut in 2021.

Current squad
As of March 2023

References

External links

Football clubs in Belarus
Association football clubs established in 2020
2020 establishments in Belarus
FC Shakhtyor Soligorsk